Robot 08 (Rb 08) was a Swedish anti-ship missile. It was the first operational ship-based anti-ship missiles. The design was a development of the French Nord Aviation CT20 target missile and was manufactured by Saab. The project to develop the weapon was initiated in the 1950s and the missile entered service in 1966 aboard the s, later also serving with the Swedish Coastal Artillery. Guidance was via radio command and active radar homing. The missile was replaced by the RBS-15, being retired in 1995.

Development 
The Royal Swedish Naval Materiel Administration experimented in the 1950s with the development of an anti-ship missile, with the project name M20. Disputes with the Air Force Materiel Administration over responsibility for missile development prolonged the development. Therefore, in 1962 the Naval Materiel Administration directed Saab to develop an anti-ship version of Nord Aviation's CT20 target missile. Saab worked with the French company on the development, with the missile, engine and some of the sensors developed in France and early flight tests taking place at a French launching ground in the Mediterranean Sea. Final production took place in the Nord Aviation factory of Méaulte (Somme) before components were sent to be reassembled in Sweden.

Design 

Wingspan was  extended and  folded. The  missile was propelled by a  Turbomeca Marboré IID jet engine and launched using a pair of rockets mounted on a launch sled, which added another  to the weight. The rockets released when the missile was airborne, which took about 2 seconds.

The missile was guided by radio command and could be equipped with either cameras for scouting or an explosive warhead.

Service 
The Swedish Navy ordered the missile in 1965 at a cost of 86 million kronor. After some test firing, the two s were equipped with the Rb 08 in 1966. It was the first operational ship-based anti-ship missile in the western world. The Swedish Coastal Artillery organized a coastal missile battery in 1968 to operate the new weapon. A total of 98 missiles were built, production completing in 1970.

A modernized version with a new seeker, Robot 08B, was planned, but did not come to fruition. Instead, the Rb 08 retired in 1995, replaced by the RBS-15, capable of both surface-to-surface and air-to-surface operation. Several Rb 08 are still preserved for display today.

References

External links

Rb 08
Guided missiles of Sweden
Military equipment introduced in the 1960s